Taylor & Ng, founded in 1965, is a retailer of Asian-inspired cooking supplies and kitchen furnishings made popular in the 1970s and 1980s. More recently the company selling products online.

History 
The company was founded in 1965 by artists Spaulding Taylor and Win Ng under the name Environmental Ceramics, and later changed to Taylor & Ng. In the 1970s and 1980s Taylor & Ng was a very popular department store of handcrafts that operated in San Francisco.

With the addition of Win Ng's brother, Norman Ng, as president, grew from a small ceramics shop on Howard Street (in San Francisco) into a major producer and retailer of housewares and owning a multi-level emporium shop at Embarcadero Center. There were also stores at other Bay Area locations as well a Taylor & Ng shop inside Macy’s in New York. These products sold heavily through Macy's and other major department stores and housewares retailers throughout the U.S. during the late 1970s and 1980s.

Win Ng's whimsical designs and animal drawings became a thematic focal point for many extremely popular Taylor & Ng products, from coffee mugs to kitchen aprons, pot holders, and dishtowels. These products sold heavily through Macy's and other major department stores and housewares retailers throughout the U.S. during the late 1970s and 1980s. He created pottery, book designs and linens for over 20 years.

In 1977, Taylor & Ng purchased a warehouse space at 67-69 Belcher St, in San Francisco's Duboce Triangle neighborhood and refurbished the 67 Belcher side only.

The San Francisco department store closed in 1985 in order to focus the business on wholesale. An online retailer with the same name, Taylor & Ng, features reissues of old company designs.

Cookbooks
The department store was known for the signature designs and illustrations by Win Ng. The company also published a number of popular cookbooks which also featured the artwork of Win Ng.

References

External links
Taylor & Ng homepage

Online retailers of the United States
Companies based in San Francisco
Kitchenware brands
1965 establishments in California
1985 disestablishments in California